The discography of Saweetie, an American rapper, consists of three extended plays, eighteen singles (including eight as a featured artist), two promotional singles and nineteen music videos. Her debut extended play, High Maintenance was released on March 16, 2018. The EP was preceded by her debut single, "Icy Grl", which was later certified platinum in the United States. Her second EP, Icy was released in March 2019, and spawned the hit single "My Type". The single went on to peak at number 21 on the Billboard Hot 100 and was certified triple platinum in the United States. 

Saweetie's debut studio album, Pretty Bitch Music, is expected to be released in 2023. The album was preceded by the singles: "Tap In", "Back to the Streets" featuring Jhené Aiko, "Best Friend" featuring Doja Cat, "Fast (Motion)", and "Closer" featuring H.E.R., as well as the promotional single "Pretty Bitch Freestyle". In 2021, "Tap In" was certified Platinum in the United States by RIAA. In November 2022, Saweetie released her fourth EP, The Single Life.

In 2021, the rapper released her first remix EP, Best Friend [Remix EP], followed by an expanded edition, which featured guest appearances from rappers and producers including Stefflon Don, Chanmina, JessB and Kito.

Studio albums

Extended plays

Singles

As lead artist

As featured artist

Promotional singles

Other charted songs

Guest appearances

Music videos

Notes

References

Discographies of American artists
Hip hop discographies